Svobodka is a rural locality (a selo) in Zharikovsky Selsoviet of Tambovsky District, Amur Oblast, Russia. The population was 178 as of 2018. There are 3 streets.

Geography 
Svobodka is located on the Gilchin River, 19 km south of Tambovka (the district's administrative centre) by road. Zharikovo is the nearest rural locality.

References 

Rural localities in Tambovsky District, Amur Oblast